= Deutsche Schule San Alberto Magno =

Coordinates: 43.2985°N 1.9906°W

- San Sebastián; Spain

Information
- Type: German international school
- Grades: Kindergarten through oberstufe

Deutsche Schule San Alberto Magno S. Coop (Spanish: Colegio Alemán San Alberto Magno) is a German international school in San Sebastián, Spain. It serves levels kindergarten through oberstufe (bachillerato/batxilergoa).

== School Bodies ==
The school community of the German School San Alberto Magno is composed of different bodies whose common goal is the optimal development of the school activities.

The German School San Alberto Magno S. Coop is the governing body of the educational institution German School San Alberto Magno, and as such, it takes care of the management of all the scholastic as well as extracurricular activities related to it. The parents of the students automatically become members of the cooperative and can thus participate in the management and future development of the school.

The Asociación de Madres y Padres de Alumnas y Alumnos (AMPA) is the parents' association or school parents' council. All parents of the school are members of the association. AMPA represents the special interests of the families and cooperates with the school management and the school advisory board in order to optimize school life. In addition, the association organizes various other activities for all families, both parents and students.
